This is a list of episodes from the fifth season of Real Time with Bill Maher.

Note that the Iraq War, President George W. Bush (from 2003 to 2009), and current/upcoming elections are frequent topics on the show and may not be listed under individual episodes.

The episode scheduled for November 9, 2007 was cancelled due to the 2007–2008 Writers Guild of America strike. This episode was to feature Ben Affleck, George Carlin, and Tom Brokaw as guests.

Episodes

References

External links
 Real Time with Bill Maher Free (audio-only) episodes & Overtime podcast direct from HBO
 HBO.com Episode List
 TV.com Episode Guide
 

Real Time with Bill Maher
Real Time with Bill Maher seasons